Sands Family Cemetery is a historic cemetery located at Sands Point in Nassau County, New York.  It was established about 1704 and includes burials through 1867.  It includes 12 rows of 86 extant headstones.  Records indicate the cemetery contains 112 members of the family, relatives, and friends.  It includes a number of notable examples of funerary art.

It was added to the National Register of Historic Places in 1992.

References

External links
 "Early Burial Grounds," by Veronica Campiello (Port Washington News; November 2, 2015)
 

Cemeteries on the National Register of Historic Places in New York (state)
1704 establishments in the Province of New York
Cemeteries in Nassau County, New York
National Register of Historic Places in Nassau County, New York